Hatheway Homestead, also known as Tinelli's Hathaway House, is a historic home located at Solon in Cortland County, New York.  It consists of a -story main block built in 1844, with a later 2-story wing addition, in the Greek Revival style.  It was built by Major General Samuel G. Hathaway (1790–1867).  The main block is constructed of smooth-surfaced fieldstone and wing of random ashlar stone blocks.  The main block features a distinctive parapet of alternating balustrade and panels.  It was later converted for use as a restaurant.

It was listed on the National Register of Historic Places in 1978.

References

External links

Tinelli's Hathaway House in CNY (Central New York): weddings, receptions, banquets or conferences

Houses on the National Register of Historic Places in New York (state)
Historic American Buildings Survey in New York (state)
Houses completed in 1844
Houses in Cortland County, New York
National Register of Historic Places in Cortland County, New York